This Is My Life (Music from the Motion Picture) is the soundtrack album to the 1992 Nora Ephron film This Is My Life, released by Qwest Records, on April 14, 1992.

The album consists of lyrical and instrumental songs written and performed by American singer-songwriter Carly Simon. The single "Love of My Life" became a Billboard Adult Contemporary chart hit, peaking at No. 16, and remaining on the chart for 15 weeks. Simon made a music video for the song, which featured her son Ben Taylor, along with clips from the film. The song has been included on several compilations of Simon's work, including the three-disc box set Clouds in My Coffee (1995), the two-disc Anthology (2002), and the single-disc Reflections: Carly Simon's Greatest Hits (2004).

The song "The Night Before Christmas" was also featured in the Ephron directed 1994 film Mixed Nuts, and included on its soundtrack album. Simon also included the song on her three-CD box set Clouds in My Coffee the following year, and it was additionally released as a promo CD single.

Track listing
Credits adapted from the album's liner notes.

Credits

Musicians

Production

Charts
Singles – Billboard (United States)

References

External links
Carly Simon's Official Website

Albums produced by Russ Kunkel
Albums produced by Frank Filipetti
1992 soundtrack albums
Carly Simon soundtracks
Qwest Records soundtracks
Albums recorded at MSR Studios
Comedy film soundtracks
Drama film soundtracks

pt:This Is My Life